Plautia is a genus of stink bugs in the family Pentatomidae. There are about five described species in Plautia, found primarily in south and east Asia and Oceania.

Species
These five species belong to the genus Plautia:
 Plautia affinis
 Plautia crossota
 Plautia splendens Distant, 1900
 Plautia stali Scott, 1874 (brown-winged green bug)
 Plautia viridicollis

References

External links

 

Pentatomidae
Pentatomidae genera
Taxa named by Carl Stål